Andre Blay (July 27, 1937 – August 24, 2018) was an American businessman, film producer, and studio executive.

Role in growth of home video industry
Blay co-founded Stereodyne, the nation's first eight-track and cassette duplication company, in 1966.

Blay then founded an audio/video production and duplication company in 1968 called Magnetic Video. He also started the Video Club of America, a direct-mail sales operation through which he offered the video cassettes produced and duplicated at Magnetic Video. He advertised the club through TV Guide, and nine thousand users initially joined the club.

That subsequently provided the model for and enabled the creation of the first video rental stores, many of which were soon started thereafter.

He was later recognized by the Consumer Electronics Association as creating the idea that "sparked a retail revolution as hundreds of mom-and-pop video rental and sales stores popped up in every community in America." In 1987, home video rental income surpassed movie theater revenues for the first time. Today, movie studios routinely make more money on video rentals and sales than from the box office of theaters.

CEO of 20th Century Fox Video
In the late 1970s, Blay paid a flat fee of $300,000 plus $500,000 yearly to 20th Century Fox to license movies from their catalogue, which he then duplicated and distributed, earning a royalty generated per video rented. This proved so successful that 20th Century Fox quickly bought Magnetic Video in 1979 to form the 20th Century Fox Video unit, for $7.2 million. Blay then served as the first CEO of 20th Century Fox Video.

Blay Video
Blay left Fox in 1981 and subsequently formed Andre Blay Corporation, a video software firm. Through this newly formed company, Blay acquired the home video rights to 90 feature films.

CEO of Embassy Home Entertainment
In 1982, Blay sold his corporation to Embassy Pictures, and became CEO of their newly formed Embassy Home Entertainment. While there he helped bring to production several movies, including Hope and Glory, Sid and Nancy, Souvenir, and A Time of Destiny. He served as CEO until 1986, when the company was sold.

Executive Movie Producer

During the next several years Blay served as executive producer for several movies:

Mosquito (1995)
Village of the Damned (1995)
Souvenir (1989)
They Live (1988)
The Blob (1988)
Jack's Back (1988 producer, uncredited)
Brain Damage (1988)
Prince of Darkness (1987)
Homeboy (1988)

He also worked in securing venture capital for films such as The Princess Bride, The Emerald Forest, and The Name of the Rose. He was also involved in the purchase of Cinema Group in 1987 with Elliott Kastner.

CEO of Enterprise Software
Blay subsequently served, until 1999, as chairman and CEO of Enterprise Software, a developer of broadcast management software for television stations and distributors, cable networks, and radio stations worldwide.

Death
Blay died from complications of pneumonia on August 24, 2018, at the age of 81.

Awards
In 2000, Blay was inducted into the Consumer Electronics Hall of Fame.
Blay was made an Honorary Alumnus at Central Michigan University's College of Business Administration in 2006.

References

1937 births
2018 deaths
American film producers
20th Century Studios people
Deaths from pneumonia in the United States